is a former Japanese female judoka. She won the bronze medal in the Openweight division at the 2010 World Judo Championships.

References

External links
 

1989 births
Living people
Japanese female judoka
Asian Games medalists in judo
Judoka at the 2010 Asian Games
Universiade medalists in judo
Medalists at the 2010 Asian Games
Asian Games bronze medalists for Japan
Universiade gold medalists for Japan
Medalists at the 2009 Summer Universiade
21st-century Japanese women